Günter Anderl (11 January 1947 – 10 October 2015) was an Austrian figure skater who competed in men's singles. He was the 1968 Winter Universiade bronze medalist, 1969 Nebelhorn Trophy champion, and a three-time Austrian national champion (1969–1971). He competed at two Winter Olympics, in 1968 and 1972.

Personal life 
Anderl was born on 11 January 1947 in Vienna, Austria. He died in Vienna on 10 October 2015.

Career 
Anderl won the junior gold medal at the inaugural Nebelhorn Trophy, in 1962. In February 1968, he competed at his first Winter Olympics; he ranked 20th in compulsory figures, 23rd in the free skate, and 23rd overall in Grenoble, France. In the same year, he won the bronze medal at the Winter Universiade in Innsbruck, Austria.

Anderl won the senior men's title at the Nebelhorn Trophy in 1969. He was the first winner of the Golden Spin of Zagreb as well as the Zugspitz Pokal and finished on the podium at other international competitions. He received the bronze medal at the 1967 Pre-Olympic Games in Grenoble. He finished eighth at the 1970 and 1971 European Championships.

In February 1972, Anderl competed at the Winter Olympics in Sapporo, Japan; he placed 14th in figures, 16th in free skating, and 15th overall. He ended his ISU-eligible career following the event. In 1979, he finished 6th at the Professional World Championships in Jaca, Spain. He established himself as a coach in Vienna, focusing on young skaters. He also served as Sportunion Wien's regional figure skating expert.

Results

References

Austrian male single skaters
1947 births
Olympic figure skaters of Austria
Figure skaters at the 1968 Winter Olympics
Figure skaters at the 1972 Winter Olympics
2015 deaths
Figure skaters from Vienna
Universiade medalists in figure skating
Universiade bronze medalists for Austria
Competitors at the 1968 Winter Universiade